Pierre-Julien Leclair (September 16, 1860 – May 10, 1897) was a Canadian politician.

Born in Sainte-Thérèse, Canada East, he was educated at the College of Ste. Therese and studied law in Université Laval, graduating with the degree of LL.B. After studying law in the office of De Lorimier & De Lorirnier, he was admitted to the practice of law in July 1883. He later became a partner in the firm Auge, Leclair & Chaffers. He was acclaimed as the Conservative candidate to the House of Commons of Canada in an 1893 by-election for the riding of Terrebonne. He did not run in the 1896 election.

References
 The Canadian album : men of Canada; or, Success by example, in religion, patriotism, business, law, medicine, education and agriculture; containing portraits of some of Canada's chief business men, statesmen, farmers, men of the learned professions, and others; also, an authentic sketch of their lives; object lessons for the present generation and examples to posterity (Volume 2) (1891-1896)

1860 births
1897 deaths
Conservative Party of Canada (1867–1942) MPs
Members of the House of Commons of Canada from Quebec
Université Laval alumni